The Ladner Leisure Centre is a recreation centre in Ladner, a community in Delta, British Columbia. The facility contains an ice rink and two swimming pools, a six-lane 25-metre competition pool and a wading pool for casual use. It also houses a 2,800 square foot weight room, a fitness studio, multi-purpose rooms, a swirl pool, a sauna, as well as a Blenz coffee shop and a private physiotherapy clinic.

The facility is the official training centre of the WHL's Vancouver Giants, the home rink of the PJHL's Delta Ice Hawks, and a home rink, along with Tilbury Arena and South Delta Recreation Centre, for the South Delta Minor Hockey Association.

During the summer months the ice is removed and surface is used for lacrosse where it is the home of the BCJLL's Delta Islanders as well as the Delta Lacrosse Association.

References

External links 
The Corporation of Delta
Ladner Leisure Centre info

Indoor arenas in British Columbia
Indoor ice hockey venues in Canada
Sports venues in British Columbia
Buildings and structures in Delta, British Columbia
Event venues established in 1992